Gorgodera is a genus of flatworms belonging to the family Gorgoderidae.

The species of this genus are found in Europe, Northern America, Australia.

Species:

Gorgodera amplicava 
Gorgodera asiatica 
Gorgodera attenuata 
Gorgodera australiensis 
Gorgodera circava 
Gorgodera cygnoides 
Gorgodera cylindrica 
Gorgodera dollfusi 
Gorgodera dunhua 
Gorgodera euzeti 
Gorgodera granatensis 
Gorgodera japonica 
Gorgodera loossi 
Gorgodera media 
Gorgodera microovata 
Gorgodera minima 
Gorgodera opaca 
Gorgodera pagenstecheri 
Gorgodera pawlowskyi 
Gorgodera permagna 
Gorgodera simplex 
Gorgodera translucida 
Gorgodera unexpecta 
Gorgodera varsoviensis

References

Platyhelminthes